Nectricladiella is a genus of fungi in the family Nectriaceae.

External links
 

Nectriaceae genera